Johann Nepomuk von Ringseis (16 May 1785 – 22 May 1880) was a German physician born in Schwarzhofen, Oberpfalz.

He received his education at the University of Landshut, where he was a student of Andreas Röschlaub (1768-1835). Afterwards he furthered his studies in Vienna (1812–1813) and Berlin (1814–1815), and in 1816 moved to Munich as a personal physician to Crown Prince Ludwig. In 1818 he was appointed Medizinalrat (medical health officer) to the district of Isarkreis. In 1826 he became a professor at the Medical Faculty of the University of Munich.

Ringseis took a religious approach towards medicine, and believed that the origin of disease was rooted in "original sin". Among his written works was System der Medizin, a publication involving his lectures on general pathology and therapy.

He died on 22 May 1880 in Munich.

References 
 This article is based on a translation of an article from the German Wikipedia.
 NCBI Medicine and religion in the work of Johann Nepomuk Ringseis

19th-century German physicians
1785 births
1880 deaths
People from Schwandorf (district)
Academic staff of the Ludwig Maximilian University of Munich